Lesbian, gay, bisexual, and transgender (LGBT) persons in the Seychelles face legal challenges not experienced by non-LGBT residents. Same-sex sexual activity has been legal since 2016, and employment discrimination on the basis of sexual orientation is banned in the Seychelles, making it one of the few African countries to have such protections for LGBT people. However, LGBT people may nonetheless face stigmatization among the broader population.

Legality of same-sex sexual activity
Until June 2016, Section 151 of the Penal Code banned male same-sex intercourse with up to 14 years' imprisonment. Female same-sex sexual acts were not covered by Section 151 or any other criminal law of the Seychelles.

In October 2011, the Seychellois Government agreed to decriminalize same-sex sexual acts "pretty soon, as the Government and civil society want so". On 29 February 2016, the Government decided to introduce a bill to this effect. The National Assembly was expected to consider the measure within a few months. Attorney General Ronny Govinden ruled out a referendum on the issue. The bill was approved on 18 May 2016, in a 14–0 vote. It was signed into law by President James Michel on 1 June, and took effect on 7 June 2016.

Recognition of same-sex relationships
The Seychelles does not recognize same-sex marriage or same-sex civil unions.

In June 2015, two men, a British national and a Seychellois national, were married at the British High Commission by Lindsay Skoll, the High Commissioner to the Seychelles.

Discrimination protections
The Employment Act, 1995 prohibits employment discrimination on the basis of sexual orientation. This prohibition was added to the act in 2006. The Act provides as follows:
Section 2. In this act –
*    *    *    *
"harassment" means any such unfriendly act, speech or gesture of one person towards another person that is based on the other person's ... sexual orientation ... as would adversely affect the other person's dignity or make that person feel threatened, humiliated or embarrassed;
Section 46A. (1) Where an employer makes an employment decision against a worker on the grounds of the worker's ... sexual orientation ..., the worker may make a complaint to the Chief Executive stating all the relevant particulars.

Summary table

See also

Human rights in Africa
LGBT rights in Africa

References

Seychelles
LGBT in Seychelles
Human rights in Seychelles
Law of Seychelles